William Morrow Fechteler (March 6, 1896 – July 4, 1967) was an admiral in the United States Navy who served as Chief of Naval Operations during the Eisenhower administration.

Biography
Fechteler was born in San Rafael, California, on March 6, 1896, the son of Rear Admiral Augustus F. Fechteler. He graduated from the United States Naval Academy with the class of 1916 and served in the battleship  during World War I. Over the following two decades, Fechteler had a variety of seagoing and shore billets, including several staff positions and command of the destroyer .

In 1942–43, Captain Fechteler served in the Bureau of Navigation (later Bureau of Naval Personnel), then commanded the battleship  in the Pacific. Promoted to the rank of rear admiral in early 1944, he was Commander of the Seventh Fleet's Amphibious Group 8 from August 1944 to March 1945, participating in landings at Morotai, Leyte, Lingayen and elsewhere in the Philippines. He spent the rest of 1945 as Assistant Chief of Naval Personnel, in Washington, D.C., followed by service as Commander, Battleships & Cruisers, Atlantic Fleet. As a vice admiral, he was Deputy Chief of Naval Operations, Personnel, from February 1947 until January 1950 and, as an admiral (February 1, 1950), was Commander in Chief, Atlantic and United States Atlantic Fleet in February 1950 – August 1951.

In August 1951, Admiral Fechteler was appointed Chief of Naval Operations (CNO), succeeding Admiral Forrest P. Sherman, who had died in office in July. As CNO, Fechteler was responsible for sustaining Korean War-era naval activities in the Far East and in the European area. He made two trips across the Atlantic in 1951–52 and one to Asia. He continued the Navy's building program for new aircraft carriers in the face of economy moves and to expand pay and benefits for the Navy's people.

When President Dwight D. Eisenhower took office in 1953, he chose to replace all the Armed Forces' chiefs. In August 1953, Admiral Fechteler exchanged positions with the new CNO, Admiral Robert B. Carney, becoming Commander in Chief, Allied Forces, Southern Europe. He served at that command's Naples headquarters until July 1956, when he retired. Over the next several years, Fechteler served on a special Defense Department study committee on personnel compensation and worked for the General Electric Company.

Fechteler died at  Bethesda Naval Hospital in Bethesda, Maryland on July 4, 1967, at the age of 71. He is buried at Arlington National Cemetery.

Namesakes

Decorations
Admiral William M. Fechteler's ribbon bar:

References

 

1896 births
1967 deaths
United States Navy personnel of World War I
United States Navy personnel of the Korean War
Recipients of the Navy Distinguished Service Medal
United States Navy admirals
United States Navy World War II admirals
United States Naval Academy alumni
Chiefs of Naval Operations
Recipients of the Legion of Merit
Burials at Arlington National Cemetery
People from San Rafael, California
Recipients of the Distinguished Service Medal (US Army)
Military personnel from California